Kalanidhi Narayanan (7 December 1928 – 21 February 2016) was an Indian dancer and teacher of Indian classical dance form of Bharatnatyam, who was the early non-devadasi girl to learn the dance form and perform it on stage in the 1930s and 1940s. After a brief career in the 1940s, she returned to dance in 1973 and became a notable teacher of abhinaya.

She was awarded the Padma Bhushan Award, India's third highest civilian honour in 1985, the Sangeet Natak Akademi Award for Bharatnatyam in 1990, given by Sangeet Natak Akademi, India's National Academy for Music, Dance and Drama  and Kalidas Samman (1998). She was also conferred  Sangeet Natak Akademi Tagore Ratna for Dance in 2011.

Early life and training
Born Kalanidhi Ganapathi  in the Brahmin household of Sumitra and Ganapati, her mother was keen on getting her dance education, and this was supported by her father. Thus starting at the age of seven she trained intensively under various gurus, this included Kamakshi Ammal, daughter of Veena Dhanam, for Padams and Javalis and Manakkal Sivarajan for vocal lessons. Noted guru Kannappa Pillai, from Kanchipuram was her main teacher of nritta (dance), he was also teacher to Balasaraswati, while Chinnayya Naidu and Mylapore Gauri Ammal taught her Abhinaya (Art of expression). Later she was to add a new dimension to abhinaya herself.

She made her stage-debut (Arangetram) at the age of 12 at the Senate House in Chennai, for the Madras Music Academy. While still in her teens, she gave two notable recitals, one with Dhanamanikkam and another with Nattuvanar K. Ganesan, son of the Kandappa Pillai.

She died in February 2016.

Career
She had a brief dance career in the 1940s, before she stepped out at the age of sixteen when her mother died and she was married into a conservative family. She returned to dance when in 1973, noted art-patron, Y. G. Doraiswamy, who had seen her performances as a teen, asked to instruct dancer Alarmel Valli in abhinaya, to which she agreed, encouraged by her sons who had by now grown up. This started the second phase of her career after a gap of 30 years at the age of 46. She also started to re-educate herself in dance, luckily her books from her younger days had survived, she started attending dance performances and Arangetram in the city, also enrolled in a course on dance theory on Bharatanatyam by Dr. Padma Subramaniam
. Gradually more students started coming to her and in the coming decades she became "the most sought after teacher for abhinaya".

On 7 December 2003, various dance teachers and her disciples, celebrated her 75th birthday at Luz Community Hall in Chennai, it was marked by a two-day seminar on abhinaya, where prominent gurus of Bharatanatyam participated. On the occasion, a set of 4 CDs on Padams was also released.

Disciples
Amongst her noted disciples are, Ramya Harishankar (USA), A.Lakshmanaswamy (India), Bragha Bessell (India), Hema Rajagopalan (India), Subashree Narayanan (USA), Minal Prabhu (India), Priya Govind (India), Sharmila Biswas,  Meenakshi Chitharanjan (abhinaya), Milana Severskaya (Russia) to name a few. She has taught numerous disciples over the years, many of whom have personalised her philosophies.

Further reading
 Kalanidhi Narayanan and Padam revival in the modern Bharata Natyam dance practice, by Priya Srinivasan. University of California, Los Angeles, 1997.
 Kalanidhi Narayanan's Triveni: selected Telugu songs of Annamayya Kshetrayya Sarangapani. Abhinaya Sudha Trust, 2008.

References

External links
 An interview with Kalanidhi Narayanan

Performers of Indian classical dance
Bharatanatyam exponents
1928 births
2016 deaths
Artists from Chennai
Indian dance teachers
Recipients of the Padma Bhushan in arts
Recipients of the Sangeet Natak Akademi Award
Teachers of Indian classical dance
Indian female classical dancers
Women educators from Tamil Nadu
20th-century Indian dancers
Dancers from Tamil Nadu
20th-century Indian educators
20th-century Indian women artists
Educators from Tamil Nadu
Women artists from Tamil Nadu
20th-century women educators